Ennahar may refer to:

 Ennahar newspaper, an Algerian daily newspaper
 Ennahar TV, an Arabic language satellite television channel

See also
 Enahara dialect